This is a list of honorary degrees awarded to the linguist, philosopher and political activist Noam Chomsky.

List

See also
 List of honorary degrees

Notes

Citations

Sources

 
Chomsky